Cryptophagus laticollis is a silken fungus beetle in the family Cryptophagidae. The species was first described by Hippolyte Lucas in 1849. It is found in Europe, northern Asia (excluding China) and North America.

References

Further reading

 
 

Cryptophagidae
Articles created by Qbugbot
Beetles described in 1849